The Zaza Dam is an embankment dam on the Zaza River about  southwest of Sancti Spíritus in Sancti Spíritus Province, Cuba. The dam was completed in 1972 with the primary purpose of irrigation but it also supports a small hydroelectric power station. Beginning in the 1990s, the Chinese government helped plan and install the hydroelectric power station. It contains two 1.35 MW Kaplan turbine-generators. The first was commissioned in October 2008, the second in February 2009.

References

Dams in Cuba
Hydroelectric power stations in Cuba
Dams completed in 1972
Energy infrastructure completed in 2009
Buildings and structures in Sancti Spíritus
1972 establishments in Cuba
21st-century architecture in Cuba
20th-century architecture in Cuba